Bonus Album is the first EP released by Khaela Maricich under the band name The Blow. It was released in 2002 by K Records.

Track listing
All tracks by Khaela Maricich except where noted.

 "The Democracy of Small Things" – 2:23
 "She Buried Herself In the Air" – 0:48
 "Some Chocolates" – 1:37
 "Jet Ski Accidents" (Anderson) – 2:49
 "The Moon Is There, I Am Here" – 2:54
 "The Touch Me" – 1:40
 "Sing Like Kyle" – 0:48
 "Watch the Water Roll Up" – 3:41
 "Little Sally Tutorial" – 3:00

Personnel 
 Phil Elvrum – Voices, Producer, Engineer
 Johannah Goldstein – Voices
 Calvin Johnson – Voices
 Khaela Maricich – Engineer
 Jason McCloud – Vocals (background)
 Mirah – Vocals

References

External links
 The Blow Official Website
 The Blow Profile @ K Records
 The Blow @ MySpace

The Blow albums
2002 albums